Ott, OTT or O.T.T. may refer to:

Entertainment
 OTT (group), a pop band from the late 1990s
 Ott (record producer), British record producer and musician
 "O.T.T" (song), a song by Fugative
 O.T.T. (TV series), a UK TV programme from the early 1980s presented by Chris Tarrant
 O.T.T., name of the re-release of Exciter's 1988 self-titled album

Other uses
 Ongi kuden (就註法華経口伝) or "The Record of the Orally Transmitted Teachings", a text in Nichiren Buddhism
 Ott (name), a surname and given name, including a list of notable people with the name
 OTT Airlines, a Chinese airline based in Shanghai
 An abbreviation for Ottawa, Ontario, Canada
 Ottawa Senators, a National Hockey League team
 Over-the-top media service, a delivery method for video and audio over the Internet, abbreviated OTT or OtT
 Over the Top Wrestling, an Irish Wrestling promotion

See also
 Otte
 OT (disambiguation)